Thomas Molineux or Thomas Molyneux (– January 1757) was an Irish luthier and maker of violins from Dublin. His instruments are some of the oldest surviving violins ever made in Ireland, one of which is preserved in the National Museum of Ireland, Dublin.

Early life

Very little is known about Molineux's early life. Based on his earliest identified instrument, it is thought that he was born some time around 1700. Rev. Father Greaven, an expert on 18th and 19th century Irish violin makers, proposed that he was a foreigner who had settled down in Dublin in early life. It has also been suggested that he may have been of Huguenot descendent. The name Molineux (and Molyneux) can be found in many seventeenth and eighteenth century records of County Dublin and County Laois. It is possible that Molineux's family may have originally been landowners in Laois before settling in Dublin, like so many other Irish luthier families of the time, such as the Delany's, Perry's, Ward's and Wilkinson's. It is also possible that many of the aforementioned luthier families may have originally been close neighbours or even related to each other, potentially explaining why so many of them ended up in the same part of Dublin city and subsequently apprenticed to one another.

Career

Molineux's earliest identified instrument is a violin dated 1739, but it is presumed that he was active earlier than this date. He worked in an area of Christ Church Yard known as 'Hell' due to an oak wood carving of the devil above the arched entrance. Despite its name, Hell was said to be an attractive place consisting of toy shops, taverns and boarding houses. It was also an area which later became synonymous with violin making in Dublin, attracting notable luthier families such as the Neale's, Dunne's, Ward's and Perry's. It is not known who Molineux was apprenticed to, or even if he learned his trade in Ireland. One possible candidate is John Neale of Christ Church Yard (active 1701–1740), whose family were thought to be the first violin makers in Ireland. Another candidate is Thomas Dunne, who was a violin maker in Christ Church Lane around 1740. However, none of their instruments are known to survive and so it is not possible to confirm whether or not they had a similar style to that of Molineux. Molineux's style has been descried as Italian in character. He branded his instruments 'MOLINEUX/DUBLIN' at the back below the button, a tradition that would be adopted by generations of Irish luthiers to come. It is not known if he inherited this trait directly from his own teacher, from the instruments of another maker such as Richard Duke of London, or from that of the pipemaking tradition in the area.

It has been proposed by some historians that Molineux may have been the teacher of famous Dublin luthier, Thomas Perry, although the style of their instruments is quite different. Perry's earlier instruments are described as Stainer-like in style, which does not fit with the Italian style of Molineux's instruments. Perry and his father, John, were working as luthiers in Christ Church Yard by 1760, if not earlier, and so it is possible that Molineux knew and interacted with both of them at the very least. Another theory is that Molineux was a teacher to George Ward, who is more likely to have been Perry's teacher based on the similarities between their instruments. Ward also started his business out of Christ Church Yard and so it is quite possible that he learned his trade from Molineux. Furthermore, Ward branded his instruments at the back in the same manner as Molineux. Molineux is said to have had a son, Martyn, who also because a well-known violin maker in Dublin. It is likely that Martyn was his pupil or apprenticed to another luthier in the area. Molineux died in January of 1757, his obituary was recorded in Faulkner's Dublin Journal (no. 3107), 25–29 January 1757: "Died. In Christ Church Yard, Mr Thomas Molineux, Fiddle Maker".

Extant instruments

It is not known how many instruments Molineux produced in his lifetime. One of his finest violins is preserved in the National Museum of Ireland as part of a collection of musical instruments by Irish makers. The collection also includes instruments by John Delany, John Mackintosh, Thomas Perry and George Ward.

Some of Ward's extant instruments:

 1739: earliest identified instrument, private collection
 (?): branded 'MOLINEUX/DUBLIN', private collection
 (?): National Museum of Ireland, Dublin

See also
John Delany (Irish luthier)
John Mackintosh (Irish luthier)
Thomas Perry (Irish luthier)
George Ward (Irish luthier)

References

Citations

Bibliography

External links

 Thomas Molineux on Dublin Music Trade
 Thomas Molineux on Brian Boydell Card Index

1757 deaths
18th-century Irish businesspeople
18th-century Irish people
Bowed string instrument makers
Businesspeople from County Dublin
Irish luthiers
Irish musical instrument makers